Parvomyces is a genus of fungi in the family Laboulbeniaceae. A monotypic genus, it contains the single species Parvomyces merophysiae.

References

External links
Parvomyces at Index Fungorum

Laboulbeniomycetes
Monotypic Laboulbeniales genera